Walter Alexander Fedorick (30 January 1918 – 18 March 1989) was a Canadian long-distance runner. He competed in the marathon at the 1948 Summer Olympics. Fedorick finished tenth in the 1950 British Empire Games marathon and twelfth in the 1950 British Empire Games 6 miles.

References

1918 births
1989 deaths
Athletes (track and field) at the 1948 Summer Olympics
Canadian male long-distance runners
Canadian male marathon runners
Olympic track and field athletes of Canada
Athletes (track and field) at the 1950 British Empire Games
Commonwealth Games competitors for Canada
Athletes from Hamilton, Ontario